Robin is an adult animated sitcom created by Swedish cartoonist Magnus Carlsson and narrated by Dave Avellone.

Plot
Every episode focused on the titular unemployed Swedish bachelor, in his early 20s and his best friend Benjamin. While neither seem to do anything constructive with their lives, they are involved in several misadventures, mostly resulting in a non sequitur ending. The following episode will feature no mention of past encounters.

The pair (or frequently, Robin alone) will have run-ins with the law, encounter drunks, flashers and other uneven characters.

Influence
In 1997, after seeing Robin on Channel 4, British rock band Radiohead approached Magnus Carlsson to make a music video for their song "Paranoid Android" with Robin in it. Carlsson accepted and came up with the original idea for the video after locking himself in his office, staring out the window at a bridge and listening to nothing but Paranoid Android repeatedly.

During the video of Paranoid Android, the band makes a cameo appearance at a bar, where they are sitting at a table drinking and watching a person with a head coming out of his stomach dancing on their table.

References

External links

1990s adult animated television series
1990s animated comedy television series
Swedish animated television series
1990s Swedish television series
1996 Swedish television series debuts
1996 Swedish television series endings
1990s German animated television series
1996 German television series debuts
1996 German television series endings
Television shows set in Stockholm